Iba-Balita was the first Filipino-language newscast of Studio 23 in the Philippines (Nicknamed as Iba-Balita Primetime) pitting up against Q's News on Q and later GMA News TV's State of the Nation with Jessica Soho. It is produced by ABS-CBN Corporation through ABS-CBN News and Current Affairs. The newscast was anchored by Anthony Taberna and Tina Marasigan. The news program was aired from October 4, 2010, to January 16, 2014, replacing News Central and was replaced by News plus.

Iba-Balita, together with Bilis Balita aired its final broadcast on January 16, 2014, as the upcoming launch new TV channel, S+A.

Anchors
Anthony Taberna
Tina Marasigan (Sports Balita and Showbiz Balita Anchor)

See also
List of programs aired by Studio 23
ABS-CBN News and Current Affairs
Iba-Balita Ngayon
Bilis Balita
TV Patrol
Bandila
News Patrol

Studio 23 news shows
Studio 23 original programming
Philippine television news shows
2010 Philippine television series debuts
2014 Philippine television series endings
Filipino-language television shows